Langelurillus ignorabilis is a jumping spider species in the genus Langelurillus that lives in Zimbabwe. The female was identified in 2008, but the male has yet to be described.

References

Endemic fauna of Zimbabwe
Salticidae
Spiders described in 2008
Spiders of Africa
Taxa named by Wanda Wesołowska